John Joseph was an American gold miner and a leader of the 1854 Eureka Rebellion at Ballarat, Australia during the Victorian gold rush.

Joseph, an African-American, was the first of the leaders of the rebellion to be tried for high treason. The authorities selected Joseph to be tried first on the basis that a jury would have no problem convicting a black man. However Joseph was quickly acquitted and was carried out of the court house and paraded in triumph around the streets of Melbourne by 10,000 supporters.

Fellow rebel Raffaello Carboni described Joseph as a "kind cheerful heart" with a "sober, plain, matter of fact, contented mind".

Joseph died four years later and was buried at White Hills Cemetery at Bendigo.

In February 2023 Joseph was honoured by the US Ambassador to Australia, Caroline Kennedy, for his contribution to Australian history and exemplifying the US Government's "commitment to racial equity and recognising historical injustice".

References

Further reading

Year of birth unknown
Year of death unknown
Eureka Rebellion
American emigrants to Australia
American gold prospectors
People acquitted of treason
African-American people